The Mallanganee National Park is a protected national park located in the Northern Rivers region of New South Wales, Australia.

The park is part of the Focal Peak Group World Heritage Site Gondwana Rainforests of Australia inscribed in 1986 and added to the Australian National Heritage List in 2007. The average altitude of the terrain is 260 meters.

See also

 Protected areas of New South Wales

References

External links
 
 

National parks of New South Wales
Protected areas established in 1999
Gondwana Rainforests of Australia
1999 establishments in Australia
Northern Rivers